Pakhapani may refer to the following places in Nepal:

Pakhapani, Parbat, in Parbat District, Dhawalagiri Zone
Pakhapani, Myagdi, in Myagdi District, Dhawalagiri Zone
Pakhapani, Rapti, in Rolpa District, Rapti Zone